Baby powder is an astringent powder used for preventing diaper rash and for cosmetic uses.  It may be composed of talc (in which case it is also called talcum powder) or corn starch. It may also contain additional ingredients like fragrances. Baby powder can also be used as a dry shampoo, cleaning agent (to remove grease stains), and freshener.

Health risks 
Talcum powder, if inhaled, may cause aspiration pneumonia and granuloma. Severe cases may lead to chronic respiratory problems and death. The particles in corn starch powder are larger and less likely to be inhaled.

Some studies have found a statistical relationship between talcum powder applied to the perineal area by women and the incidence of ovarian cancer, but there is not a consensus that the two are linked. In 2016, more than 1,000 women in the United States sued Johnson & Johnson for covering up the possible cancer risk associated with its baby powder. The company stopped selling talc-based baby powder in the United States and Canada in 2020 and has said it will stop all talc sales worldwide by 2023. However, Johnson & Johnson says that its talc-based baby powder is safe to use and does not contain asbestos.

See also

References

Babycare
Materials
Skin care
Powders